Chilakamukhi also spelled as Chilkmukhi is a village in the Koppal taluk of Koppal district in the Indian state of Karnataka. Chilakamukhi is located northeast to District Headquarters Koppal.

Demographics
As of 2001 India census, Chilakamukhi had a population of 1,502 with 755 males and 747 females and 239  Households.

See also
Bewoor
Kukanapalli
Irakalgada
Bahaddur Bandi
Kushtagi
Hospet
Koppal

References

External links
www.koppal.nic.in

Villages in Koppal district